Love, Lies and Lizzie, a young adult romance novel, is the fourth installment of Rosie Rushton's Jane Austen  in the 21st Century series.

Plot summary
The book, which was published in 2009, is based on Jane Austen's 1813 novel Pride and Prejudice. It tells the story of the main character, Lizzie Bennet, dumping her boyfriend—Toby. Lizzie's sister, Jane, was surprised by it because Toby is crazy about Lizzie.

It also talks about the mother, Mrs Bennet, telling her five daughters that the family is moving to the new house at Priory Park. At first, the sisters did not feel good about being there but they soon got involved in parties and James Darcy's life.

References

2009 British novels
British young adult novels
Novels by Rosie Rushton
Novels based on Pride and Prejudice